The business mileage reimbursement rate is an optional standard mileage rate used in the United States for purposes of computing the allowable business deduction, for Federal income tax purposes under the Internal Revenue Code, at , for the business use of a vehicle. Under the law, the taxpayer for each year is generally entitled to deduct either the actual expense amount, or an amount computed using the standard mileage rate, whichever is greater.

The business mileage reimbursement rate is used by some employers for computing employee reimbursement amounts when an employee operates a motor vehicle not owned by the employer for the employer's business purposes. The General Services Administration (GSA) sets the rate for federal jobs. In general, the GSA rate matches the annual rate set by the IRS, although by law the government employee reimbursement rate cannot exceed the mileage rate set by the IRS for business deductions.

Reimbursement by an employer on a per-mile basis is also used in other countries; it offers a similar simplification to payment of subsistence per diem.

Reimbursement rates since 1991

References
IRS.gov Standard Mileage Rate Overview
IRS Document 463; Form 2106, Internal Revenue Service, U.S. Dept. of the Treasury (for applicable years); IRS Rev. Proc. 2005–78; IRS Rev. Proc. 2006–49; IRS Rev. Proc. 2008–72.

Revenue Procedure 2008–72, I.R.B. 2008–50, November 24, 2008, Internal Revenue Service, U.S. Dep't of the Treasury.

IRS increases mileage rate for remainder of 2022

Internal Revenue Service
Corporate taxation
Accounting terminology
Tax terms